Natalia Gaitán Laguado (born 3 April 1991) is a Colombian professional footballer who plays as a midfielder for Liga MX Femenil club Tigres UANL and captains the Colombia women's national team. With her country Gaitán played at the 2012 and 2016 Olympics and also made a powerful appearance at the 2015 Women's World Cup in Canada.

Club career
Gaitán signed for Valencia CF in September 2015. She had previously played in Spain for CD Transportes Alcaine in the 2013–14 season. She played the 2014 WPSL season with Houston Aces and spent the first half of 2015 in a national team training camp.

Studies
Gaitán received a Bachelor's of Business Administration from the University of Toledo and an MBA in International Sports Management from Valencia CF in Spain.

Personal life
Gaitán was diagnosed with acute lymphoblastic leukemia aged four and underwent chemotherapy treatment from 1994 to 1998.

References

External links 
FIFA Player Natalia Gaitán 
 

1991 births
Living people
Footballers from Bogotá
Colombian women's footballers
Women's association football midfielders
Toledo Rockets women's soccer players
Zaragoza CFF players
Valencia CF Femenino players
Sevilla FC (women) players
Tigres UANL (women) footballers
Primera División (women) players
Colombia women's international footballers
2011 FIFA Women's World Cup players
2015 FIFA Women's World Cup players
Olympic footballers of Colombia
Footballers at the 2012 Summer Olympics
Footballers at the 2016 Summer Olympics
Footballers at the 2015 Pan American Games
Medalists at the 2015 Pan American Games
Pan American Games medalists in football
Footballers at the 2019 Pan American Games
Medalists at the 2019 Pan American Games
Pan American Games gold medalists for Colombia
Colombian expatriate women's footballers
Colombian expatriate sportspeople in the United States
Expatriate women's soccer players in the United States
Colombian expatriate sportspeople in Spain
Expatriate women's footballers in Spain
Colombian expatriate sportspeople in Mexico
Expatriate women's footballers in Mexico